Dan Petrașincu (born Angelo Moretta; ; 2 June 1910 – 1997) was an Italian-Romanian anthropologist, writer and translator.

He was born in Odessa from an Italian father and a Romanian mother. In the aftermath of the Russian Revolution, when he was ten years old, the family fled to Romania, where he went to high school in Râmnicu Sărat and Bucharest.

He worked as a copy-editor for "Rampa”, "Adevărul”, "Reporter”, "Lumea românească”, "România literară”.

Together with Mihai Șerban and Ieronim Sârbu he published the magazine "Discobolul" (1932-1933).

He translated from Victor Hugo, Gaston Baty, Wanda Wasilewska, etc.

After 1950 he lived in Italy, and died in Rome in 1997.

Works
Sângele, Bucharest, 1935 (for which he was given the "Dimineața” newspaper's Prose Award)
Omul gol, Bucharest, 1936 (re-written as Omul și fiara, Bucharest, 1941)
Monstrul, București, 1937;  (re-written as Copilăria cu umbre), Bucharest, 1944; Bucharest, 1994
Miracolul, Bucharest, 1939
Junglă, Bucharest, 1940
Edgar Poe, iluminatul, Bucharest, 1942
Cora și dragostea, Bucharest, 1943
Timpuri împlinite, Bucharest, 1947
Un mare poet al libertății: Alexandru Sergheevici Pușkin, Bucharest, 1949
La resa dei conti, Rome, 1957
Lo spirito dell'India, Rome, 1960 Romanian edition: Spiritul Indiei (București, 1993) 
Gli dei dell'India, Milan, 1966; I miti indiani edition, Milano, 1982;  Romanian edition: Mituri indiene (Bucharest, 1998)
Il pensiero Vedanta, Rome, 1968;  Romanian edition: Gândirea Vedanta, (Bucharest, 1996)
La parola e il silenzio, Rome, 1970;  Romanian edition: Cuvântul și tăcerea. O posibilă reconstituire a Logosului cu ajutorul conceptului de Sabda-Sphoța din lingvistica indiană (Bucharest, 1994)
Il Daimon e il superuomo, Rome, 1972;  Romanian edition: Daimon și supraom (Bucharest, 1994)
Aurobindo e il futuro dell'uomo, Rome, 1974
Il Quinto millennio, Milan, 1979
I miti delle antiche civilta messicane, Milan, 1984;  Romanian edition: Miturile vechilor civilizații mexicane (Bucharest, 1998)
Miti antichi e mito del progresso. Antropologia del sacro dal paleolitico al nucleare, Genoa, 1990;  Romanian edition: Mituri antice și mitul progresului. Antropologia sacrului din paleolitic până în era nucleară (Bucharest, 1994)
7 miti maya e aztechi e delle antiche civilta messicane, Milan, 1996

References
Aurel Sasu, Dicționarul biografic al literaturii române, M-Z, Ed. Paralela 45, Pitești, 2006, pp. 340–341

1910 births
1997 deaths
Romanian novelists
Romanian male writers
Italian male novelists
Romanian essayists
Romanian translators
Italian essayists
Italian orientalists
Italian anthropologists
Romanian emigrants to Italy
Emigrants from the Russian Empire to Romania
Writers from Odesa
20th-century translators
20th-century Italian novelists
20th-century Italian male writers
Male essayists
20th-century essayists
Italian male non-fiction writers
20th-century anthropologists